The Rook is an American television series, loosely based on the novel of the same name by Daniel O'Malley, and originally adapted by Stephenie Meyer. It was ordered direct-to-series at Starz in July 2017. Meyer left the series due to creative differences as the first and second episodes were being filmed. It premiered on June 30, 2019 in the United States on Starz and on July 1, 2019 in the United Kingdom on the Virgin TV Ultra HD channel. On March 4, 2020, Starz confirmed that they had decided not to continue it beyond the original eight episode miniseries.

Premise
Myfanwy Thomas finds herself at Millennium Bridge in London surrounded by dead bodies with no memory of how she came to be there. She soon discovers that she is an agent with supernatural abilities in a British secret service called the Checquy.

Cast

Main

Emma Greenwell as Myfanwy Thomas, a Rook in the inner court of the Checquy
Joely Richardson as Linda Farrier, the King in the Checquy
Jon Fletcher as Teddy and Alex Gestalt, two of the four bodies sharing one mind, the Rook Gestalt
Ronan Raftery as Robert Gestalt, a third body of the Rook Gestalt
Catherine Steadman as Eliza Gestalt, a fourth body of the Rook Gestalt
Adrian Lester as Conrad Grantchester, the Queen in the Checquy
Olivia Munn as Monica Reed, an agent from the American BVA, a Checquy sister agency

Recurring
Ruth Madeley as Ingrid Woodhouse, a Pawn in the Checquy
 Shelley Conn as Danielle Wulff, a Chevalier in the Checquy, their PR expert
 Gina McKee as Jennifer Birch, senior UK Government Minister responsible for the Checquy
 Barry Atsma as Peter Van Syoc
 Luke Roberts as Marcus Kevler
 Michael McElhatton as Lorik, a senior representative of the Lugate
Aidan O'Callaghan as Apex Analyst
 Tamsin Topolski as Bronwyn, Myfanwy's sister
 James D'Arcy as Andrew Bristol, a former therapist for the Checquy
 Michael Karim as Nazim, an EVA with the ability to erase people's memory

Episodes

Reception

Critical response
On Rotten Tomatoes, the series received an approval of 44%, and a 5.83/10 average rating from 16 reviews. The critics' consensus states, "Though it teases some appealingly pulpy puzzle pieces, The Rook's dour tone and convoluted machinations overshadow its intriguing premise." Metacritic, which uses a weighted average, assigned the series a score of 62 out of 100 based on 6 critics, indicating "generally favorable reviews".

Production
Somerset House features as "Apex House", the Checquy headquarters overlooking the River Thames. The Port of Dover was used in the series when production filmed inside Cruise Terminal Two, outside quayside and along Cruise Terminal.

References

External links
 

2019 American television series debuts
2019 American television series endings
English-language television shows
Starz original programming
Television series by Lionsgate Television